Abbar is a name.

People with this given name include:
 Abbar (563-562 BC), king of Tyre

People with this surname include:
 Mohammed bin Ali Al Abbar (born 1956), a United Arab Emirates businessman.

Places
Ab Bar, Iran

Arabic-language surnames